The Telum is a microprocessor made by IBM for their IBM Z mainframe computers, announced at the Hot Chips 2021 conference on August 23, 2021. Telum is IBM's first processor that contains on-chip acceleration for AI inferencing while a transaction is taking place. The first Telum-based system was the IBM z16, introduced in April 2022.

Description
The chip contains 8 processor cores with a deep superscalar out-of-order pipeline, running with more than 5 GHz clock frequency, optimized for the demands of heterogenous enterprise class workloads. The completely redesigned cache and chip-interconnection infrastructure provides 32 MB cache per core, and can scale to 32 Telum chips. The dual-chip module design contains 22 billion transistors and 19 miles of wire on 17 metal layers.

See also
 z/Architecture
 IBM System z
 Mainframe computer

References

z15
z15
Computer-related introductions in 2019